The Nigeria mens national under-19 volleyball represents Nigeria in international men's under-19 volleyball competitions and friendly matches.

Team achievements
The Nigeria Team won the under-19 Boys African National Volleyball Championship for 2021 and 2022 years on a row.

The team defeated Egypt in 2022 to clinch the trophy while the team defeated Morocco in 2021 to clinch the Trophy.

The Nigeria Team is the first Sub-Saharan Team to attend the FIVB Volleyball Men's Club World Championship twice.

The team won the 2018 African Youth Games title.

Team Players
Some of the players that were involved in the African National Volleyball Championship in 2021 includes;

Pascal Ozokonye, Lawal Babatunde and Jeremiah Alexander.

Some outstanding players that featured in the African National Volleyball Championship in 2022 includes

Raheem Olayemi, Abdulaziz Aliyu and Elisha Anebi.

References

Volleyball in Nigeria
Volleyball
Volleyball clubs